The Lake Placid Olympic Ski Jumping Complex, also known as the MacKenzie Intervale Ski Jumping Complex, consists of HS100- and HS128-meter ski jump towers built for the 1980 Olympic Games in Lake Placid, New York, United States. Modernized and lengthened in 2021, they are the only jumps in North America homologated for winter and summer jumping competitions. The complex is operated by the Olympic Regional Development Authority.

The 128-meter jump features a Observation deck which offers views of nearby John Brown's Farm and the surrounding High Peaks of the Adirondacks. Training and competition for Nordic ski jumping takes place year round thanks to a plastic mat out-run on the 90m jump. The Freestyle Aerial Training Center is located to the right of the base of the jump towers. Aerialists can train in the summer months by jumping into a 750,000 gallon pool.

In 2018, funding was approved to upgrade the tracks with cooling to ensure winter operation. Also, the smaller hills will be upgraded to current FIS standards with a safer spread of heights for jumpers to progress. This is in tandem with a number of major games being hosted by Lake Placid over the next few years.

On 11 February 2023, they hosted first World Cup Men's super team (pairs) event in history.

History
The Lake Placid Club built the first ski jump on this site in 1920, using the hillside itself as the jump surface. The jump was referred to as the Intervales 35-meter jump. On February 21, 1921, the first competition was held at this site, drawing 3,000 spectators. The record jump for the day was 124 feet, set by Antony Maurer. In 1923, the jump was enlarged to fifty meters, and in 1927, a new steel tower was built, raising the jump to 60 meters. In 1928, the tower was raised to 75 meters; this was the tower used for the 1932 Winter Olympic Games. In 1977, the old tower was demolished to make way for new 70 and 90-meter jumps, used for the 1980 Winter Olympic Games. In 1994, the landing hills were re-graded to bring the jumps into compliance with current rules, and increasing their height to 90 and 120 meters. In 2019, a pulse gondola was installed to replace an aging double chair which served the ski jumps. In 2021, both jumps received upgrades that enabled year-round training and increased reliability, in addition to a new base lodge.

The towers were built using a jacking system that lifted and poured concrete into the forms continuously, night and day, for 15 days for the larger jump, and 9 days for the smaller one.

The present record jumps stand at 105 meters for the 90-meter jump, set by Andrew Osadetz of Canada, and 136.0 meters for the 120-meter jump, set by Ryōyū Kobayashi of Japan.

Events

Olympics 
The complex was a venue in the 1932 Winter Olympics and 1980 Winter Olympics.

World Championships

FISU Winter World University Games

World Cup

Other
Winter Goodwill Games: 2000

References

Venues of the 1932 Winter Olympics
Venues of the 1980 Winter Olympics
Ski jumping venues in the United States
Sports venues in Essex County, New York
Olympic Nordic combined venues
Olympic ski jumping venues
1920 establishments in New York (state)
Sports venues completed in 1920